In early Egyptian mythology, Anhur (also spelled Onuris, Onouris, An-Her, Anhuret, Han-Her, Inhert) was a god of war who was worshipped in the Egyptian area of Abydos, and particularly in Thinis. Myths told that he had brought his wife, Mehit, who was his female counterpart, from Nubia, and his name reflects this—it means (one who) leads back the distant one.

One of his titles was Slayer of Enemies. Anhur was depicted as a bearded man wearing a robe and a headdress with four feathers, holding a spear or lance, or occasionally as a lion-headed god (representing strength and power). In some depictions, the robe was more similar to a kilt.

Roles

God of war

Due to his position as a war god, he was patron of the ancient Egyptian army, and the personification of royal warriors. Indeed, at festivals honoring him, mock battles were staged. During the Roman era the Emperor Tiberius was depicted on the walls of Egyptian temples wearing the distinctive four-plumed crown of Anhur.

The Greeks equated Anhur to their god of war, Ares. In the legend of Olympian gods fleeing from Typhon and taking animal form in Egypt, Ares was said to have taken the form of a fish as Lepidotus or Onuris.

Sky Bearer
Anhur's name also could mean Sky Bearer and, due to the shared headdress, Anhur was later identified with Shu, becoming Anhur-Shu. He is the son of Ra and brother of Tefnut if identified as Shu.

High priests of Anhur
 Amenhotep, from the time of Thutmose IV. Amenhotep's wife Henut was a songstress of Anhur. Their sons Hat and Kenna were Chariot Warriors of His Majesty. Known from a stela now in the British Museum (EA 902).
 Nebwenenef High Priest of Anhur during the reign of Seti I. Was appointed High Priest of Amun in the beginning of the reign of Ramesses II.
 Hori
 Minmose, son of the High Priest of Anhur Hori and his wife Inty. From the reign of Ramesses II. 
 Anhurmose, from the time of Merenptah.
 Sishepset, from the time of Ramesses III
 Harsiese, mentioned on an ostracon in Abydos

In popular culture
Anhur is a playable character in the multiplayer online battle arena, SMITE. Anhur is a Hunter wielding a spear and bears title the Slayer of Enemies and is shown in his (anthropomorphic) lion form maintaining his beard, robe, and a crown incorporating four large feathers.

Anhur is a chaotic god in the computer game NetHack/Slash'EM.

Onuris has a minor role in the 2012 fantasy novel The Serpent's Shadow as a presumed dead god who is revived in order to destroy the Lord of Chaos, Apophis.

Anhur is one of the 20 bosses you fight in the video game Boss Rush: Mythology.

The American death metal band Nile did two tracks about Anhur in their 2000 album Black Seeds of Vengeance, called Masturbating the War God and Libation Unto the Shades Who Lurk In the Shadows of the Temple of Anhur.

References

External links 

 http://www.religionswissenschaft.uzh.ch/idd/prepublications/e_idd_onuris.pdf  Iconography of Onuris]

Egyptian gods
Nubian gods
War gods
Ares
Lion deities